Groundling may refer to:

 Groundling, a person who visited the Red Lion, The Rose, or the Globe Theatre in the early 17th century
 The Groundlings, an improvisational and sketch comedy troupe and school